Hagan Landry (born July 14, 1994) is an American Paralympic athlete specializing in throwing events. He represented the United States at the 2020 Summer Paralympics.

Career
Landry represented the United States in the men's shot put F41 event at the 2020 Summer Paralympics and won a silver medal.

References

Living people
1994 births
Athletes (track and field) at the 2020 Summer Paralympics
Medalists at the 2020 Summer Paralympics
Paralympic medalists in athletics (track and field)
Paralympic silver medalists for the United States
Track and field athletes from New Orleans
American male shot putters